Galactites is a genus of flowering plants in the family Asteraceae.  The name is derived from the Greek γάλα (= "milk"). The best known species is  Galactites tomentosus.

 Species
 Galactites duriaei Spach ex Durieu - Spain, France, Channel Islands (UK), Monaco, Andorra, Gibraltar, Algeria, Morocco
 Galactites mutabilis Durieu - Algeria, Tunisia
 Galactites rigualii Figuerola, Stübing & Peris - Spain
 Galactites tomentosus Moench (sometimes spelled tomentosa but see Tropicos) - Spain, France, Italy, Greece, Albania, Montenegro, Malta, Algeria, Tunisia, Morocco, Azores, Canary Islands, Madeira

References 

Cynareae
Asteraceae genera